Margaia may refer to:
Mărgaia, a village in Lupșa, Romania
Margaea, a town in ancient Elis, Greece